Lauenburgische Seen is an Amt ("collective municipality") in the district of Lauenburg, in Schleswig-Holstein, Germany. It is situated around Ratzeburg. The Amt was renamed by 1.1.2007 from Amt Ratzeburg-Land. Its seat is in the district city Ratzeburg, itself not part of the Amt.

The Amt Lauenburgische Seen consists of the following municipalities (population in 2005 between brackets):

References

Ämter in Schleswig-Holstein